The following highways are numbered 228:

Canada
 Prince Edward Island Route 228
 Quebec Route 228

Costa Rica
 National Route 228

Japan
 Japan National Route 228

United States
 Arkansas Highway 228
 California State Route 228 (former)
 Florida State Road 228
 Florida State Road 228A
 Georgia State Route 228
 K-228 (Kansas highway)
Kentucky Route 228
 Maine State Route 228
 Maryland Route 228
 Massachusetts Route 228
 Minnesota State Highway 228
 Montana Secondary Highway 228
 Nevada State Route 228
 New Mexico State Road 228
 New York State Route 228
 Ohio State Route 228
 Oregon Route 228
 Pennsylvania Route 228
 Tennessee State Route 228
 Texas State Highway 228 (former)
 Texas State Highway Spur 228
 Utah State Route 228
 Virginia State Route 228